The Hundesprechschule Asra or Tiersprechschule Asra (Asra talking school for dogs, Asra talking school for animals) was an institution for performing dogs that existed in Leutenberg, Thuringia, Germany, from 1930 until near the end of World War II.  Its Nazi talking dogs became a popular topic in the English-speaking press in 2011, when Jan Bondeson's Amazing Dogs: A Cabinet of Canine Curiosities used it as an example of Nazi-sponsored animal research.

History
The Hundesprechschule Asra was founded in 1930 by Margarethe Schmidt in Villa Viola, the house on the edge of the town of Leutenberg that she shared with her mother. It was named Asra after a particularly talented Great Dane,2 who was the mother of five of the six dogs at the school; the other, a terrier, was added later as a rescue. Near the end of the war, in 1945, the villa was occupied by increasingly large numbers of refugees and Margarethe Schmidt closed the school and moved to West Berlin.

The dogs were to be trained to talk, count, and reason, and the Schmidts held performances at local venues. A child evacuee described such a performance in 1944, saying that the dogs could tell the time, describe people, and correct misspellings. Max Müller, a veterinarian at the University of Munich,2 visited the school in 1942, at which time there was also a cat. The dogs could speak some words but were limited by the structure of their vocal apparatus; they responded more fluently using a code of a number of barks (or rings of an electric bell in the case of the terrier) for each letter. However, the training was only a show; the dogs' utterances were largely incomprehensible and their counting was a trained response. Another person who had attended a performance compared it to the circus, and recalled that the dogs did not speak, supposedly because it was too cold.

Müller's article stated that Hitler had accepted Schmidt's offer for her dogs to perform for members of the Wehrmacht under the auspices of the Strength Through Joy program, but it is unknown whether this happened before the end of the war. There had been work in Germany on teaching dogs to reason and communicate throughout the nineteenth century, and beginning in 1910 a German pointer named Don became famous for being able to say that he was hungry and ask for cakes.56–64 The "new animal psychology" had been developed by Karl Krall and others to characterize the reasoning abilities of animals, particularly canine philosophers such as the Airedale terrier Rolf, and had many adherents in Germany in the 1920s.35–53 Experiments in human-canine telepathy were conducted.46–47

Jan Bondeson's Amazing Dogs
In 2011, Jan Bondeson mentioned the Hundesprechschule Asra in his Amazing Dogs: A Cabinet of Canine Curiosities as an example of Nazi experiments in animal-human communication.50 He told an interviewer, "Hitler was himself interested in the prospect of using educated dogs in the war effort, and he advised representatives of the German army to study their usefulness in the field." Many newspapers reported the school as a project to aid the war effort by training dogs to work as concentration camp guards, or in surveillance, and that promising dogs were recruited for it. Maureen Dowd wrote in an op-ed piece in The New York Times about strange Nazi plans that "[the] story set off a panting spate of 'Heel Hitler,' 'Furred Reich,' 'Wooffan SS' and 'Arf Wiedersehen' headlines in British tabloids and plenty of claims that Hitler was 'barking mad.'" Bondeson told the German Süddeutsche Zeitung that Hitler had ordered the SS to investigate the possible military utility of the training, and the newspaper labeled a picture of a Munich telepathy experiment from the book as having been taken at Asra.1
 
Bondeson ascribed most of the successes to the Clever Hans effect, and said that press coverage had exaggerated what he wrote. The Nazis encouraged research in animal psychology and were looking for military applications, "but that's a million miles away from the press claims—which get taller by the day—that the Nazis had a legion of talking, machine-gun-toting hounds, on the point of being unleashed on the allies."

Margarethe Schmidt's nephew and others denied that Hundesprechschule Asra was sponsored by the Nazis, saying that if it had been, she would have been punished after the war. The performances were the only source of income for her and her mother, and although there were many committed party members in the town, Schmidt "complained over and over again about chicanery on the part of the authorities." In 1943 she wrote that she was no longer receiving any food for the dogs because she did not pay taxes and was neither breeding her animals nor doing "scientifically notable" training, and at the end of the war she wrote that there was a plan to kill the dogs, resettle her, and seize the house from her mother.

See also 
  (reports about "talking" dogs in other countries)

Notes

References

Sources
 Max Müller. "Über das Sprechen von Tieren in Wortbegriffen des Menschen. Die Leutenberger Tier-Sprechschule ASRA." Tierärztliche Mitteilungen 24.7/8 (1943) 71–72 

Science in Nazi Germany
Military animals
Dog training and behavior
Talking animals
Animal intelligence
Military animals of World War II
Research and development in Nazi Germany